Field house or fieldhouse is American English term for an indoor sports arena or stadium.

Fieldhouse, Field House or Fields House may also refer to:

People
 David Fieldhouse (1925–2018), English historian of the British Empire
 H. Noel Fieldhouse (d. 1983), Canadian historian
 Homer Fieldhouse (1928–2008), American landscape architect
 Janet Fieldhouse (b. 1971), Australian ceramic artist
 John Fieldhouse, Baron Fieldhouse (1928–1992), Royal Navy Admiral of the Fleet
 John Fieldhouse (rugby league) (b. 1962), English rugby league footballer
 Roger Fieldhouse (1940–2020), British historian
 Simon Fieldhouse (b. 1956), Australian artist/painter

Residences

United Kingdom
 Field House, Sowerby, West Yorkshire, England

United States
Alphabetical by state then city
 Eugene Field House (Denver, Colorado), listed on the National Register of Historic Places (NRHP) in Southeast Denver
 Field House (New Hartford, Connecticut) or Sun Terrace, NRHP-listed
 Fields Heirs or Fields House, Middletown, Delaware, formerly NRHP-listed
 J.R. Field Homestead, Indianola, Florida, NRHP-listed
 Field Estate, Sarasota, Florida, NRHP-listed
 Fields Place-Vickery House, Dahlonega, Georgia, NRHP-listed
 Timothy Fields House, Ashland, Kentucky, NRHP-listed in Boyd County
 John Field House, Columbia, Kentucky, NRHP-listed
 Fields' House, Springfield, Kentucky, NRHP-listed in Washington County
 Marshall Field Garden Apartments, Chicago, Illinois, NRHP-listed
 Eugene Field House (Amherst, Massachusetts), a University of Massachusetts Amherst residence hall
 Eugene Field House (St. Louis), Missouri, a National Historic Landmark and NRHP-listed
 Seaman Field House, Deming, New Mexico, NRHP-listed
 Marshall Field, III, Estate, Lloyd Harbor, New York, NRHP-listed
 William Fields House, Greensboro, North Carolina, NRHP-listed
 Walter Field House, Cincinnati, Ohio, NRHP-listed
 Hugh Fields House, Brownsville, Oregon, NRHP-listed in Linn County
 Field Farm, Ferrisburgh, Vermont, NRHP-listed
 James A. Fields House, Newport News, Virginia, NRHP-listed

See also
 Eugene Field House (disambiguation)
 Field Club Historic District, Omaha, Nebraska, NRHP-listed